The 1983 Little League World Series took place between August 23 and August 27 in Williamsport, Pennsylvania. The East Marietta National Little League of Marietta, Georgia defeated the Liquito Hernandez Little League of Barahona, Dominican Republic in the championship game of the 37th Little League World Series.

The Championship Game did not feature a team from Taiwan for the first time since . Their six consecutive finals appearances remain a record by one country or U.S. state.

Teams

Championship Bracket

Position Bracket

Champions Path
The East Marietta National LL had an undefeated record of 11–0 to reach the LLWS. In total, their record was 14–0.

Notable players
 Marc Pisciotta (Marietta, Georgia) – MLB pitcher from 1997 to 1999

References

External links

Little League World Series
Little League World Series
Little League World Series